The Baskerville Shield is a trophy awarded to the winner of rugby league test series between England and New Zealand. It named in honour of Albert Henry Baskerville, who organised the first ever tour by New Zealand of Great Britain in 1907.

The spelling of the trophy is somewhat controversial, as there is much evidence to suggest that Baskiville was the correct spelling of the surname.  However, the Rugby Football League used the Baskerville spelling arguing that this was the version used by the man himself.

There is also a trophy with this name awarded to the winner of the National Competition in New Zealand.

History
The shield was inaugurated for the 2002 New Zealand tour of Great Britain and France in which New Zealand played eight games in Europe and one in Oceania, winning six of these, including three against British club sides and one against an England A team.  The test series between New Zealand and Great Britain was drawn, with one win each and one draw. The New Zealand Rugby League agreed that Great Britain should keep the inaugural shield because it wasn't won outright. 

In the 2007 New Zealand tour of Great Britain and France, Great Britain won the series 3-0 to retain the shield.  The largest of these losses was a 0-44 result in front of 20,324 at the KC Stadium, Hull. The tour was conducted as part of the celebrations of 100 years of New Zealand rugby league and was played in honour of the original 1907 tour.  New Zealand played six games in total with five of these in Europe.  After the tour, the Great Britain team was put on hiatus with the individual home nations taking priority on the international stage and as a result lengthy tours stopped taking place.

In the 2015 New Zealand tour of England, the shield was contested between New Zealand and England as the Great Britain team had been retired in 2007. England won the shield 2–1.  The tour was the first to Europe by an Australasian team since the previous tour by New Zealand in 2007.  The tour took place because Australia pulled out of a similar tour that they had agreed to undertake.  The tour was shorter than others with just four games taking place, three against England and one against Leeds Rhinos.  New Zealand won the Leeds game and the second test by just 9–2 in front of 44,393 at Olympic Stadium, London.

England and New Zealand contested the Baskerville Shield again during the 2018 New Zealand rugby league tour of Great Britain. England won the shield 2–1, taking an unassailable lead with victories in the first two tests before New Zealand gained a consolation win in the final match.

Future
In 2017 it was confirmed that the Great Britain team would be revived and start touring again, which means that they will once again compete for the Baskerville Shield.  Great Britain are scheduled to tour Australasia in 2019, which will be the first Baskerville Shield to be played out in the southern hemisphere.

Results

Player Statistics

Try scorers

Goal scorers

Attendances

Average attendances
The 2015 series saw an average of 11,527 more people attend the three tests, this major increase owing largely to the test played at Olympic Stadium, London when 44,393 people were in attendance.

Seven different stadiums have been used over the twelve tests that have taken place.  DW Stadium, Wigan has been used the most times with three tests held there.

Highest Attendances
The highest attendance in the history of the Baskerville Shield test series is 44,393 which was seen at the Olympic Stadium, London, the only game to be played outside of the traditional rugby league heartland of the north of England.

References

Rugby league international tournaments